History of Ohio University, compiled by numerous authors, predates its founding, as a part of the post-Revolutionary period that saw the nation's first land grants and continues through stages of conflict and change into standardization, digital advents, widespread research, and its present survival with strategic research, retrenchment, and impactful upgrades. Most of the content on this article is from Ohio University 1804–2004:  Spirit of a Singular Place by Betty Hollow.

America's experiment

Charter
Public support for higher education in America was not new when Manasseh Cutler first decided to organize an expedition bound for the Ohio Country. Ohio University would become the first legislated public university due to passage of the Northwest Ordinance, which had explicitly included support in the form of land for higher education. President Thomas Jefferson's policy initiatives included a westward expansion of the new nation, with a goal of adding several territories to U.S. statehood. The university was first envisioned by Manasseh Cutler, credited as the school's founder along with Revolutionary War Brigadier General Rufus Putnam. Cutler had served as a chaplain in then-General Washington's Continental Army. On March 1, 1786, Cutler attended a meeting at the Bunch of Grapes Tavern with Putnam,  Benjamin Tupper, and Samuel Holden Parsons to form the Ohio Company of Associates.  The following year, Cutler organized a contract with Congress whereby his associates (former soldiers of the Revolutionary War) might purchase one and a half million acres (6,000 km2) of land at the mouth of the Muskingum River with their Certificate of Indebtedness, which led to a contract being drawn up, later approved by the Confederation Congress. Provisions of the contract included setting aside two townships in the center of the purchase for a university; these "College Lands" are in Appalachia. The Confederation Congress, which operated under the Articles of Confederation, did not work with an executor or cabinet. Executive roles transacted from committees of Congress or appointed persons. Selling about five percent of what was to become the State of Ohio to the Ohio Company's group of Revolutionary War Veterans, the Congress furthermore adopted the Ordinance of 1787, which made Ohio University the first institution of higher education ever to be chartered through acts of Congress, with the very purpose of expanding education. Additionally, the 1787 ordinance stated: "Religion, morality and knowledge being necessary to good government and the happiness of mankind, schools and the means of education shall forever be encouraged;" this phrase is engraved on the university's gateway. Thus Ohio University became the first land grant institution of higher education in the United States, preceding the more famous Morrill Act land grant institutions by nearly three-quarters of a century. The result of the Ohio University is directly from "the organic law of the territory," and Cutler's contract for the purchase of the land, both in 1787; Cutler's desire was that the university be named American University.

Establishment

By the spring of 1788, Rufus Putnam had gathered fifty laborers, surveyors, and boat builders and proceeded to the Muskingum River, and he surveyed and laid out a town to provide a home for the future university. In 1797, settlers from Marietta traveled downstream on the Ohio River and up the Hocking River to establish a location for the school, founding Athens due to its location directly between the original capital of Chillicothe and Marietta. "On January 8, 1802, the legislature of the Northwest Territory and Governor Arthur St. Clair approved the charter of the American Western University. This institution of higher education was never opened." In addition to being instrumental in its founding, Putnam was also an original trustee of the university, and Putnam Hall is named after him. During the establishment of its first university, "Ohio was occupied by numerous American Indian tribes:" the land on which Ohio University stands is the traditional territory of the Haudenosauneega Confederacy and the Osage Nation, which was consigned to the United States by the Western Confederacy in 1795 as part of the Treaty of Greenville. George Washington stated "the settlement of southeastern Ohio was not accidental, but the result of the careful deliberation of wise, prudent, and patriotic men."
The third charter was approved on February 18, 1804, establishing "Ohio University," recognized by the new state as its charter was certified by the Ohio General Assembly. This last approval happened eleven months after Ohio was admitted to the Union.  On December 6, 1804, the first trustees, including Putnam, and Governor Tiffin gathered to raise operating funds by leasing university lands. In the spring of 1806, the trustees began to train pupils for the college's work. That year, a two-story building was completed by Jehiel Gregory on the College Green. The first three students enrolled in 1809. The first two bachelor's degrees were granted in 1815. All three legal charters placed Ohio University as the first institution of higher education founded and nourished by an act of Congress in America; the first in the territory northwest of the Ohio River; and the first in Ohio. The university's "flagship" status, if there is any in Ohio, has been defended several times; although the state's public university "systems" were not truly unified until much later (2007).

Mid-to-late nineteenth century

John Newton Templeton became the first Black graduate of the university in 1828. An idea of the university's radical history was gathered in the commencement of 1828, featuring elements as groundbreaking as the speaker role of Templeton and an address on Female Education—decades before the suffrage movement and Civil War began.
The university's journey as an academic center would not see its maturity until after the 1830s, as it struggled to garner significant funds from the state legislature, a body notoriously controlled by farmers who despised liberal arts. The first publication, The Echo and University Record, began and was discontinued in 1843. Ohio University was closed between 1843 and 1848. Beta Theta Pi became the first fraternity.
Many people from Athens were active in the Civil War activities on behalf of the Union. The university served as station of interest for activity between Ohio and what would become West Virginia. The Morrill Land Grant College Act's passage saw Ohio and Miami universities attempt to persuade the state to divide designated 630,000 acres of land, but delays curtailed the effort and ultimately, Ohio was neglected by the Stalwarts who did not gift land or monies from the act to it. In 1874, the Ohio General Assembly instead strongly supported the new Ohio State University created by the Morrill Act in Columbus and proposed that both Ohio and Miami be demoted to preparatory schools. In 1880, it was suggested that Ohio and Miami be merged directly with Ohio State, but the 1896 Sleeper Bill introduced by Athenian David L. Sleeper, the Speaker of the Ohio House of Representatives, provided annual support for the university from the state, allowing for Ohio University's survival and elevation to being a state university and setting the precedent for continuing state support. Thus, Ohio University was one of the earliest institutions of higher education in the state to be invested with some state-level public support through taxes, starting in 1896. A second challenge to demote the university was defeated in 1906.

Growth and female education

Arrival of college women

Women entered the university for the first time as students in 1868. Margaret Boyd graduated from Ohio University in 1873, having enrolled in the university's preparatory program in the spring of 1868. Recurrent melancholy and illness led to her diary entries that read "I feel so sad today" and "I feel so sick and so bad," although she added she could do as well as boys. On June 17 she informed President Scott she did not want a diploma with masculine endings, and the endings were changed. Scott remarked at the 1873 commencement ceremony that Boyd was the "oldest of a great sisterhood of graduates." Boyd has remained a popular historical figure on the Ohio University campus, with numerous functions named in her honor. On January 9, 1874, The Ridges began operation as a mental hospital. Only a few years after Boyd became the university's first woman graduate in 1873, there were fourteen female students on campus, including Minerva Woodson, who was probably the first female Black student to enroll at Ohio University. Leading suffragist Susan B. Anthony visited Athens in 1878. A decade after Boyd's graduation, the East Wing, now Wilson Hall, housed thirty women at $0.50 per week; the janitor's family; and the first female faculty member, Cynthia Weld, who was hired in 1883 to teach history and rhetoric. Beginning in 1902, the new State Normal College (later the College of Education) drew many women who were planning to become teachers. To house them, the university acquired Howard Hall and in 1906 built Boyd Hall, named for Margaret Boyd. However, the university did not provide a place for Martha Jane Hunley (Blackburn), who graduated summa cum laude with a major in literature and English studies in 1916. Hunley, the first Black female graduate, had to find her own housing in Athens. In 1999, the university recognized her accomplishment by placing her name, along with John Newton Templeton's, on the Templeton-Blackburn Alumni Memorial Auditorium. By the twentieth century, almost half the university's students were female. They organized chapters of four national sororities—Pi Beta Phi (1889), Alpha Gamma Delta (1908), Alpha Xi Delta (1911), and Chi Omega (1913); several departmental clubs, including the Home Economics Club and Kindergarten Club; and the Young Women's Christian Association, or YWCA, which sponsored activities ranging from volunteering in the community to team sports. In 1913, with about 330 women and nearly 500 men, the university hired its first Dean for Women. Arriving on her thirty-first birthday, Dean Irma Voight later wrote that aside from getting a desk in the hallway of Cutler Hall, she received little instruction, much less comradery, from President Alston Ellis. Within three weeks, she called a meeting of all women students and faculty to discuss establishing a Women's League, which would develop "spirit, loyalty, and standards."

Modern university

The modern era witnessed a university that departed from the former frontier university model. Since a liberal arts curriculum was what the university offered through the 1800s, liberal arts centrality to the whole university and their faculties were not fully organized until they became a unique albeit stayed the main undergraduate college—the College of Liberal Arts—in 1902.
During her thirty-six years of influence on the campus, Dean Voight helped pioneer activities for women with her involvement in the university branch of the YWCA, the Women's Recreation Association, Student Council, and the Panhellenic Council and as the first president of the Athens branch of the American Association of University Women (AAUW). In 1920, when the nineteenth amendment gave women the right to vote, Voight, a suffragist, arranged political forums for women, believing that some men were "sitting back and waiting for us to make a mess out of our enfranchisement." Voight liberalized women's rules, refereed women's basketball games, and took hiking trips with "her girls."  
Ohio restructured its two colleges into five in 1935, establishing the colleges of Commerce, Fine Arts, and Applied Science in addition to the existing colleges of Arts & Sciences and  Education. The Graduate College was created in 1936, and the first Ph.D. program was initiated in 1956 in chemistry. Dean Irma Voight retired in 1949. Three years after her funeral in 1953, Voight Hall was named in her honor. Flo Hutchins, in a 1950 letter to Dean Voight, wrote:

Leona Wise Felsted and Janice Battin Bixler each served as dean of women for brief periods in the early 1950s. In 1953 Margaret Deppen, an early feminist, was appointed. When the positions of dean of women and dean of men were dissolved in 1962, Dean Deppen took the new title Director of Organizations and Activities, retiring in 1975.
Starting mid–century, the university also began to establish regional campuses throughout southeast Ohio. The first, Ohio University – Chillicothe, was opened in 1946 to help eliminate post-World War II overcrowding on the university's main campus. The school began with 281 students, 70 percent of which were armed services veterans. Later campuses would come in 1946 at Zanesville, 1956 in Ironton and Lancaster, 1957 in St. Clairsville, and 2006 in Proctorville.

War and activism

Increased enrollment
The 20th century saw dramatic growth in student enrollment, academic offerings, and research facilities. The World War I and World War II years had seen incredible work of Ohio students and faculty to the Allied war effort, and many service people returned home to embark into college studies. Between 1955 and 1970, undergraduate enrollment tripled from 7,000 to 20,000. During this era, the campus grew, with the construction of 25 new dormitories located on two new residential college greens, with radio and television stations, research and classroom facilities, and the construction of the 13,000-seat Convocation Center arena.

1960s

The Athens campus of the 1960s saw recognition of the consequences of hegemony, a simultaneous commitment to the ideals of the Declaration of Independence and United States Constitution, and developments for gender equality, environmentalism, and equal education for African Americans. In 1963, the university's first Black faculty member was hired by the English department. The next year brought James Barnes to Political Science and Ronald Williams to Hearing and Speech. Representatives from Black organizations met with President Alden to propose separate dormitories for African American students, the hiring of more Black faculty, the inclusion of more Africana works in the library, and more attention to programming for Black students. 
In 1964, U.S. President Lyndon B. Johnson publicly referenced his Great Society initiative for the first time on the College Green, giving the university exposure across America and internationally. The 1960s ushered numerous changes for women at the university as well. In spring of 1967, the band director eliminated women from the famous Marching 110 marching band in order to build "greater esprit de corps," and for seven years after, the band remained open only to male members. When the American Federation of State, County, and Municipal employees, AFSCME, went on strike the same year, they demanded "equal classification of jobs" and more sensible requirements for cafeteria workers (who were all women). For several nights in 1969, hundreds of women stayed out past the university women's curfew in protest of the curfew policy. The main library was opened in May 1969, dedicated outside as Freedom Library and inside as Alden Library, complete with a student hunger strike. Alicia Woodson, student body president, was a relative of Minerva Woodson who had been a student nearly a century before, and warned students the only thing they had complete control over was their own bodies.

1970s

The 1970s were a decade of further change.  The Vietnam War was extremely unpopular to Ohio University students and Athens residents alike, and in its wake, saw the emergence of some of America's foremost examples of student protest and civil unrest during the era. On May 4, 1970, the Ohio National Guard was ordered to open fire on students demonstrating against the war at Kent State University, killing 4 and wounding 9. At the same time, there were sit-ins and anti-war riots at Ohio University, even more intense than those of Kent State. This was partly due to the administration's refusal to close the university; instead of going home, many students from other Ohio universities that did close came to Athens to protest further. When the Ohio National Guard was called in to Athens, there was a 3-hour battle at the Baker Center, resulting in 23 injured and 54 arrested students. On May 15, the campus was closed. The university ceased women's hours in 1972. President Claude Sowle appointed 1969 alumna Beverly Price as special assistant for women's affairs. Reverend Jan Griesinger, the first female minister in Athens, directed United Campus Ministry which established the Athens Women Against Rape in 1974 and the Athens chapter of the National Organization for Women (NOW) in 1975. In 1974, a group of female part-time faculty led a survey that concluded low-wage jobs, inadequate benefits, and sub-standard housing were actively offered through university contracts. Subsequently, the faculty senate proposed several improvements. In 1975, Ohio established its medical school, known as the Heritage College of Osteopathic Medicine. Heritage is the only medical school in the state to award the Doctor of Osteopathic Medicine degree. Patricia Richard, Joy Huntley, and Barbara Daniel organized the first women's studies program at the university in 1978. In 1979, the program established a certificate program with a $10,000 budget. In 1978, six women in the music school filed a complaint with the Equal Employment Opportunity Commission that resulted in an investigation of the inequities between men's and women's pay, and the adjustment of $30,000 in equitable wages. After the incident, the Provost's office initiated regular "salary equity studies." That same year, the Athens Women's Collective grew out of talks within United Campus Ministries, and raised issues pertaining to violence that produced the Student Escort Service. In 1979, the collective organized the first Take Back the Night March, and saw hundreds of women and men rally against staying home as being a solution to unsafe street violence and rape. That same year, on the university's 175th anniversary, Chubu University of Japan donated 175 cherry trees.

University to the world

1980s-1990s

Since the 1980s, many new programs, faculty, undergraduates, and postgraduates contributed to the expanded global imprint of Ohio. Defining trends of this period include process standardization, digital advents, and largescale research that would give rise to Ohio becoming a distinctive national university, and not only an undergraduate-focused or regional entity similar to newer universities in state. By 1980, eighteen women's studies courses were being offered by twelve departments. Also in the early 1980s, the university faced allegations that it discriminated on the basis of sex in its intercollegiate athletic program, and also saw the first time women outnumbered men 7,735 to 6,474; however, faculty and graduate assistant numbers were reversed. The Ohio University Innovation Center, a technology business incubator, started in 1983. The Ohio University Edison Biotechnology Institute was founded in 1984. A graduate Women's Studies program was approved in 1985.
The number of tenure-tracked female faculty spiked from 150 in 1992 to 240 that year; 265 women played on university-sponsored intercollegiate athletic teams. In 1993, Barbara Ross-Lee, D.O., was appointed Dean of the Heritage College of Osteopathic Medicine, becoming the first female African American to serve as dean of a medical school in America. Queer visibility increased on the Athens campus in the 1990s. In the Glidden administration, from 1994 to 2004, new construction included the Life Sciences Research Facility, Emeriti Park, Walter Hall, plus major renovations to Gordy Hall, Grover Center, and Memorial Auditorium; the expansion of Bentley Hall and Copeland Hall; and groundwork for the new Baker Center that opened in 2007. At the seventy-fifth anniversary of women's suffrage in 1995, the university placed a plaque on Memorial Auditorium commemorating Susan B. Anthony's visit to Athens. In 1999, the university hired Susan Burgess as the first full-time tenured director of the women's studies program.

2000s-2020s
The 2000s, 2010s, and 2020s have rapidly spurred the impact of Ohio University. By the bicentennial year 2004, Distinguished Teaching Professors recognized by the university included Alan R. Booth (PhD Boston University, Professor of Humanities and History since 1964 – History of Southern Africa), Lois Davis Vines (PhD Georgetown University, Professor of Humanities and French since 1969 – Poe abroad), Thomas H. Carpenter (PhD Oxford University, Professor of Humanities and Classics since 1996 – Art and myth in Ancient Greece), and Dean McWilliams (PhD University of Oregon, Professor of Humanities and English since 1969 – Butor and Gardner). Roderick McDavis was elected Ohio University's first Black president, serving 13 years. In 2009, Venki Ramakrishnan shared the Nobel Prize in Chemistry with Thomas A. Steitz and Ada Yonath, "for studies of the structure and function of the ribosome."

Ohio University became a space-grant institution in the 2010s. In Fall of 2012, Ohio University converted its academic calendar from quarters to semesters, after first having changed to quarters in 1967. Through the contemporary period, the College Green has hosted numerous speeches from prominent voices. Philanthropists have increased total contributions to the university in its present period more so than ever before. Ohio University maintains a Women's Center dedicated for use of university women at the Baker University Center: The center features studying space, health-related stations, and female-integrated programming to foster the five university pillars of the honor code. Additionally, the student body recognizes a Women's Affairs Commission as one of several commissions on Student Senate. 
The university has carried out strategic research, undertaken difficult retrenchment, created impactful quality upgrades, and strengthened students for their future. In January 2022, Ohio University achieved its first national designation as R1: Doctoral Universities – Very high research activity. In April 2022, Larry Connor became the first person to reach inner Earth and outer space within one year. As of 2022, Ohio University comprises nine campuses, nine undergraduate colleges, its Graduate College, its college of medicine, and its public affairs school, and offers more than 250 areas of undergraduate study as well as certificates, master's and doctoral degrees. Ohio University ranks among the top 30 largest residential college campuses in the United States.

Presidents

The Ohio University has known twenty-two men lead as its President. A conflict arose during the presidency of William Holmes McGuffey, who was also a Presbyterian minister, and Ohio University was closed between 1843 and 1848, due to poor financial conditions partly caused by a power struggle between faculty and Methodist ministers. There was a proposal in the Ohio Legislature to move Ohio University to Mansfield, Ohio, due to Athens' hostility to the institution; however, the scheme was defeated. Alfred Ryors, another Presbyterian, succeeded McGuffey. "With [Solomon] Howard's election [to be university president after Ryors,] domination of University affairs passed from the Presbyterians to the Methodists." Except for Super, Crook, McDavis, Nellis, and Sherman, all presidents of the university have buildings named after them, most notably Ping Recreation Center and Baker University Center; the remaining buildings are residence halls and operations buildings.

* Edwin Watts Chubb was acting president for one year in 1920 when President Ellis died and again in 1934 when President Bryan died.

See also
 History of Ohio
 List of Ohio University alumni
 List of Ohio University faculty

Notes

References

Further reading
  Vernon R. Alden:  An Oral History. Athens:  Ohio University Libraries, 1999.
  John C. Baker:  An Oral History. Athens:  Ohio University Libraries, 1995.
  The Decade of the University:  Ohio University and the Alden Years. Meno Lovenstein.  Athens, Ohio:  Lawhead Press, 1971.  A philosophic account of the university in the 1960s

External links
 

Ohio University